The Stade de la Duchère-Balmont, formerly the Stade de la Duchère or the Stade de Balmont, is a multi-purpose stadium in Lyon, France.

The stadium is the home ground of football club Lyon La Duchère and roller-skating club .

History  
The opening of the stadium took place in 1966 on the site of the former Fort Duchère. In 2013, the athletics track was upgraded; the new track, upgraded at a cost of 1.75 million euros, was inaugurated in presence of the discus thrower Mélina Robert-Michon.

References  

9th arrondissement of Lyon
Football venues in France
Sports venues completed in 1966
Sports venues in Lyon